Andoorkonam  is an area in Trivandrum city in the Indian state of Kerala.

It is located approximately 20 km from the Thiruvananthapuram city. Andoorkonam is noted for its reserves of Kaolinite (china clay). The temple of Sree Ramadasa Ashram is nearby.

Demographics
 Indian census, Andoorkonam had a population of 14,736 with 7,147 males and 7,589 females.

Culture 
Trijyotipuram Mahavishnu temple with the presence of Trimurti, is situated in this place.  

Maruppancodu Devi temple and the Kudamuttom Jama-ath are also situated here.

Velloor Muslim Jama-ath and Kottuppa (R) Mah-lara are situated nearby Pallippuram, AndoorKonam.

Panimoola Devi temple is situated nearly 1.5km away from Andoorkonam junction

Facilities 
The Primary Health Centre (PHC) at Andoorkonam junction is the main health care facility in this Village. 

A Govt. Homeo Dispensary is also functioning in Andoorkonam Panchayath. It was upgraded to Govt.Model Homoeo Dispensary in December 2018.

Andoorkonam LP School is a much sought after institution which has helped in  the educational uplifting of the people of this village.

The AKG Samskarika samithy and the Republic Library contribute a lot in various cultural, sports and educational activities. 

Sithara Arts & Sports club is a social service organization that promotes cultural development. All Brothers arts and sports club is also functioning  here very effectively.

Chirakkakam Clinical Services (CCS) is the Private Hospital at Andoorkonam junction functioning since 2008.

Geography
The village is surrounded by Pallippuram to the north, Vembayam to the east, Vavara Ambalam to the west and Kazhakoottam to the south.

References

Villages in Thiruvananthapuram district